Edmundo López (born 13 August 1935) is a Venezuelan fencer. He competed in the individual and team sabre events at the 1952 Summer Olympics.

References

External links
 

1935 births
Living people
Venezuelan male sabre fencers
Olympic fencers of Venezuela
Fencers at the 1952 Summer Olympics
20th-century Venezuelan people